Ministry of Public Works and Highways (Arabic: وزارة الأشغال العامة والطرق) is a government ministry of Yemen.

List of ministers 

 Salem Mohamed al-Harayzi (28 July 2022 – )
 Manea Ben Yamain (18 December 2020 – 28 July 2022)

See also 

 Politics of Yemen

References 

Government ministries of Yemen